Under the Bed 2 is a 2014 Chinese horror suspense thriller film directed by Yuan Jie. It was released on August 22, 2014.

Plot

Cast
Abby
Li Henan
Chen Yuan
Song Wei
Chen Jiamin 
Cynthia
Li Zhuoyuan 
Zhong Chao

See also
Under the Bed 3

References

2014 horror thriller films
Chinese horror thriller films